Victor Kwesi Mensah (born June 6, 1993), known professionally as Vic Mensa, is an American rapper and singer. He was a member of the group Kids These Days, which broke up in May 2013, after which he released his debut solo mixtape Innanetape. He is currently signed to Roc Nation.

Mensa is also a founder of the hip-hop collective Savemoney which includes frequent collaborator Chance the Rapper. He also is the founder of the SavemoneySavelife foundation, whose mission is to use art and entertainment to foster sustainable change, and funds three programs in Chicago centered on health and the arts. Mensa's debut single "Down on My Luck" was released in June 2014 by Virgin EMI. His debut studio album The Autobiography was released in July 2017.

Mensa has been outspoken on the issue of gun violence.

Life and career

1993–2012: Early life
Victor Kwesi Mensah was born on June 6, 1993. His father is from Ghana and his mother is a white American. Mensa grew up in the Hyde Park neighborhood of Chicago. He attended Whitney M. Young Magnet High School and while a freshman, met Chancelor Bennett in passing (Bennett would later be known as Chance the Rapper).

Mensa began his career when he formed a band called Kids These Days in 2009. The band would eventually release two projects, an extended play titled Hard Times in 2011, and a mixtape titled Traphouse Rock in 2012.

2013–2014: Innanetape and XXL Freshman Class

Following the band's split up in May 2013, Mensa performed with Gorillaz frontman Damon Albarn at Albarn's 2014 performance at the Governors Ball Music Festival, where he performed the track "Clint Eastwood", filling in for MC Del the Funky Homosapien. When announcing a tour for 2015, Mensa said that he has plans to collaborate with Albarn sometime in the near future.

On September 18, 2013, it was announced, that Mensa would be joining J. Cole and Wale on the What Dreams May Come Tour. Mensa would eventually release his debut mixtape, Innanetape, which was released on September 30, 2013.

Following the end of the What Dreams May Come Tour, he toured Europe with Danny Brown, for the beginning of February 21, 2014 and ending on March 8. To cap off his rise to stardom, Mensa was chosen to be on the cover of XXL for the Freshman Class of 2014. Mensa's debut single "Down on My Luck" was serviced to urban contemporary radio in the United Kingdom on May 12, 2014. On the same day, the music video for the song was released. "Down on My Luck" was then released for digital download in international markets on June 6, 2014, by Virgin EMI Records.

2015–2017: There's Alot Going On and The Autobiography

On February 12, 2015, Kanye West debuted a song, titled "Wolves" at his Adidas Originals showcase. The song featured Mensa himself, along with Sia. Mensa later performed "Wolves" alongside West and Sia on Saturday Night Live's 40th Anniversary Celebration three days later. Mensa would later release an official collaboration with Kanye West, titled "U Mad" on April 10. Eleven days later, Roc Nation announced that Vic had signed to its label, and a video of Mensa signing the deal alongside Jay-Z backstage at his On the Run Tour in Chicago was released on Tidal. Later on in 2015, Mensa received a nomination for Best Rap Song at the 58th Grammy Awards as a songwriter for co-writing Kanye West's single "All Day".

On February 8, 2016, it was announced that Mensa, along with Travis Scott and iLoveMakonnen, will be a part of Alexander Wang's "WANGSQUAD" campaign. On February 19, Mensa released a single, titled "No Chill" onto iTunes with Skrillex. It was produced by Skrillex and Jahlil Beats. Mensa's collaboration on Kanye West's "Wolves", would eventuality be released after West updated the album's Tidal track list off his seventh studio album The Life of Pablo with a reworked version of "Wolves", which included previously removed guest vocals from Mensa and Sia, and separated Frank Ocean vocals into a separate track on March 16, 2016.

On June 3, 2016, Vic Mensa released his second extended play titled, There's Alot Going On. With only one guest feature from Ty Dolla Sign, the EP tackled issues such as the Flint water crisis, the murder of Laquan McDonald, and self-inflicted wounds. Mensa's EP debuted at number 127 on the US Billboard 200 chart.

He and his friends were stopped by police for assumed stealing after his spending spree at Barney's of $4,000. He has performed as the opening act during Justin Bieber's Purpose World Tour in Europe.

Leading up to the release of Mensa's debut studio album, he released his third extended play, The Manuscript on June 8, 2017. Three days later, Mensa announced and revealed the album's title of his debut studio album titled, The Autobiography. Mensa would release the lead single titled, "Wings" featuring Pharrell Williams and Saul Williams on July 13. The Autobiography was released on July 28, 2017, through Roc Nation. The album featured guest appearances from Weezer, Syd, The-Dream, Chief Keef, Joey Purp, Pharrell Williams, Saul Williams, Ty Dolla Sign, and Pusha T. The album debuted at number 27 on the US Billboard 200 chart with first-week sales of 15,000 copies first week.

2018–2019: Hooligans and 93Punx
Mensa later went on and released his fourth extended play titled, Hooligans on December 14, 2018. The extended play was supported by the singles: "Reverse" featuring G-Eazy and "Dark Things".

In January 2019, Mensa formed a punk rock and rap band named 93Punx, they later released a cover of The Cranberries song "Zombie". 93Punx later released their debut single, "Camp America", featuring children in cages in an ICE-inspired video. The singles "3 Years Sober" with Travis Barker and "It's a Bad Dream" featuring Good Charlotte was followed up and released in July and August 2019 respectively. Their self-titled album was released on August 23, 2019.

2020-present: V Tape, Akilla's Escape, I Tape and Vino Valentino 
Mensa returned in August 2020 with his first single of the year, "No More Teardrops", featuring Malik Yusef and Wyatt Waddell, a song tackling police brutality, street crime, corruption and the prison system. The song appeared on Roc Nation's compilation album, Reprise. Mensa would later release his fifth extended play, V Tape, on August 21, 2020 which features from Snoh Alaegra, SAINt JHN, BJ Chicago Kid, Peter Cottontale and Eryn Allen Kane.

Also in 2020, Mensa would take a leap into acting in the TIFF film Akilla's Escape, in which he played the character Prince. The film would go on to be nominated for 8 Canadian Screen Awards subsequently winning 5 of them, including Best Original Screenplay

On March 26, 2021, Mensa put out the album I Tape, again under Roc Nation. The album further explored the themes of the American Dream that riddled his prior works, discussing the shattering of expectations brought on by the reality of systematic abuse. The album quickly garnered commendation from rap news outlets for its unabashed condemnation and meditation on racial injustice in America and its message of prison reform. With tracks featuring Chance The Rapper and Wyclef Jean, the album saw a good wave of popularity in the underground scene, and signaled a return to form for the rapper from a critical standpoint.

Off the heels of I TAPE's praise, he would go on to release the 4 song EP Vino Valentino on Valentine's day 2022.

Controversy 
In October 2018, as part of his BET Hip Hop Awards Cypher, Mensa dissed late rapper XXXTentacion, referencing his domestic abuse charges and mocking his murder. Subsequently, he received backlash on social media as well as from other artists. Additionally, Vic Mensa was criticized as hypocritical by radio host Charlamagne tha God, as Mensa had previously admitted to choking a woman. Mensa later apologized on Instagram for dissing XXXTentacion in front of his mother, but stood by the lyrics, saying: "Recently, I did a freestyle for the BET [Hip Hop] Awards cypher addressing and condemning rappers who unabashedly abuse women and those who stand up for them and even call them legends, I stand behind those statements. It was pre-recorded weeks ago, and I had no idea a grieving mother would be in the audience to honour her lost son. I never intended to disrespect her, and I offer my deepest condolences for her loss at the hands of gun violence. However, I vehemently reject the trend in Hip Hop of championing abusers, and I will not hold my tongue about it. I don’t give a fuck about getting attention. I care about bringing awareness and holding people accountable for their actions".

Legal issues
On January 15, 2022, Mensah was arrested at the Washington Dulles International Airport by the Metropolitan Washington Airports Authority Police after U.S. Customs and Border Protection discovered a cache of drugs including LSD and psilocybin mushrooms, capsules and gummies. He was charged with felony narcotics possession charges.

Artistry
In interviews with XXL and Complex, Mensa cited hip hop artists such as Jay-Z, Kanye West, Earl Sweatshirt, A Tribe Called Quest, Timbaland, Eminem, Biggie Smalls, Missy Elliott, Lupe Fiasco,  UGK, J Dilla, The Pharcyde, DMX, Nas, 2Pac, Hieroglyphics, De La Soul, Wu-Tang Clan, Lil Wayne, Kid Rock, and Snoop Dogg as musical influences. In 2013, XXL called his breakthrough mixtape Innanetape "lyrical nourishment" and commented on his ability to "bend words at will, cramming syllables into lines with obvious glee."

Discography

Studio albums
 The Autobiography (2017)

Collaborative albums
 93Punx  (2019)

Awards and nominations

References

External links
 

1993 births
Living people
American hip hop record producers
American male rappers
American people of Ghanaian descent
Midwest hip hop musicians
Rappers from Chicago
Songwriters from Illinois
American hip hop singers
21st-century American rappers
Record producers from Illinois
21st-century American male musicians
American male songwriters